David Esdaille (born 22 July 1963) is an English former professional footballer who played as a midfielder. He made appearances in the English football league for Wrexham, Bury, and Doncaster Rovers.

References

1963 births
Living people
English footballers
Association football midfielders
Winsford United F.C. players
Wrexham A.F.C. players
Bury F.C. players
Altrincham F.C. players
Droylsden F.C. players
Doncaster Rovers F.C. players
Flixton F.C. players
English Football League players
Footballers from Manchester